Aaron Van Poucke (born 4 April 1998 in Bruges) is a Belgian professional road bicycle racer, who currently rides for UCI ProTeam .

Major results
2016
 3rd La Route des Géants
2018
 1st Stage 1 (TTT) Okolo Jižních Čech
 3rd Overall Course de Solidarność et des Champions Olympiques
1st  Young rider classification
 7th Lillehammer GP
2019
 10th Cholet-Pays de Loire
2020
 10th Paris–Chauny
2022
 3rd Overall ZLM Tour
2023
 1st  Sprints classification Vuelta a Andalucía

References

External links

1998 births
Living people
Belgian male cyclists
Sportspeople from Bruges
Cyclists from West Flanders